The Battle of Charah (12-17 March 1918) or Charah Expedition was a battle between the Assyrian Volunteers led by Agha Petros and Malik Khsoshaba against Shekak tribesmen led by Simko Shikak in revenge for the assassination of Mar Benyamin Shimun by Simko. Simko Shikak, who was responsible for the murder of the Assyrian patriarch Mar Shimun was staying in the fortress. The fortress had never been conquered despite numerous attempts by the Iranian government.

Assassination of Mar Benyamin Shimun 
In March 1918, Mar Benyamin and many of his 150 bodyguards were assassinated by Simko Shikak (Ismail Agha Shikak), a Kurdish agha, in the town of Kuhnashahir in Salmas (Persia) under a truce flag. Daniel Malik Ismail managed to rescue the body while His brother Dawid Mar Shimun hid in a nearby Armenian church.

Battle 
The soldiers of Urmia did not get to the fortress of Charah by 12 March, as the military leaders told them in the letter to Lady Surma. But in that month groups of guards were organized from the Salamas forces on those high mountains looking for the Assyrian Soldiers of Urmia waiting for them to attack Charah.

On 15 March the Honorable Surma, her brother Dawid Mar Shimun, Palkounik Kondriatoff, and officer Valodia commanded saying on 16 March the remaining parts of Kuhnashahir must be attacked before the soldiers of Urmia near Charah so that the back of Assyrians would be empty from the enemy.

At two o'clock during midnight Malik Oshana of Tkhuma and Malik Shamisdin of Lower Tyari who had at their possession two machine guns surrounded the town of Kuhnashahir. Rab Khaila Dawid and Shlemon Malik Ismael placed a cannon on the hill of Mar Yokhanan. Rab Tremma (Commander of 200) Lazar Kaku d'Bet Samano of Upper Tyari among the army where placed in Qalasar village, between Khusrabad and Diliman, to safeguard the front from the Iranian army, so they could not go up and aid the Kurds in Kuhnashahir. Rab Tremma (Commander of 200) Daniel Malik Ismael and Rab Tremma (Commander of 200) Israel Pityo of Tkhuma with their troops were left in Khusruabad, to be sent who ever would need saving the most.

In the morning the battle started around the section of town that was not damaged. The Assyrians started firing cannons and would later stop because Assyrian attacks pushed inside. Soon after the whole town surrendered, the people killed from the Assyrians was about 71 while the Kurds lost about 500. Soon after Dawid Mar Shimun was informed by guards guarding mountain tops that the Assyrian forces of Urmia had arrived, soon after the forces of Urmia began to battle fiercely.

The reason for the Urmia forces delay was due to running into Kurds at villages on the way to Kuhnashir, Agha Petros was the leader of all the battle Agha Petros and his advisers Malik Ismail II and Malik Khoshaba.

On 16 March the forces of Urmia began their attacks on the Charah fortress, the Kurds fought fiercely and the Assyrians had not expected that many rebels to be fortified in the castle. The next day very early in the morning the Assyrians fired cannons from the army on the north side of Charah. Daniel Malik Ismail would guard the road towards Khana Barrri while Awwo son of Shmoel Khan with the left side of the Urmia and were placed near Khana Bari thus surrounding the fortress. Soon after Assyrians began to fire cannons, machine guns, Maxim guns and rifles towards the fortress and the trenches of the enemy. Soon after Daniel Malik Ismail was ordered to relinquish his position on Khana Barri and was ordered by Dawid Mar Shimun not to send reinforcements to guard the road. Soon after Assyrian forces entered the trenches of the Kurds.

Aftermath 
When Simko saw the Assyrians tearing apart his forces, he began to panic, abandoning his men and fleeing thru the road of Khana Barri.

It is said that the river in Charah was completely red from the dead Shikak fighters.

See also 

 Urmia Clashes
 Battle of Suldouze
 Persian Campaign
 Sayfo
 Assyrian Rebellion
 Assyrian Volunteers
 Assyrian Levies
 Mar Benyamin Shimun
 Mar Paulos Shimun
 Agha Petros
 Malik Khoshaba
 Surma Mar Shimun
 Simko Shikak Revolt (1918-1922)
 Simko Shikak Revolt (1926)

References 

Assyrian nationalism
Assyrian genocide
History of the Assyrians
Middle Eastern theatre of World War I